William Fitzalan, 11th Earl of Arundel, 8th Baron Maltravers KG (147623 January 1544) was an English peer, styled as Lord Maltravers from 1487 to 1524.

FitzAlan was the son of Thomas Fitzalan, 10th Earl of Arundel, and Margaret Woodville (died before 6 March 1490), daughter of Richard Woodville, 1st Earl Rivers, and a younger sister of Elizabeth Woodville, wife of Edward IV.

He married firstly, after 1501, Elizabeth Willoughby, daughter of Robert Willoughby, 1st Baron Willoughby de Broke, and secondly, on 15 February 1510, he married Lady Anne Percy, a daughter of Henry Percy, 4th Earl of Northumberland. He succeeded to the title of 11th Earl of Arundel on the death of his father Thomas in 1524 and became Lord Chamberlain in 1526.

FitzAlan bore the Sceptre with the Dove at the coronation of Anne Boleyn in 1533 and later took part in her trial in 1536. During the dissolution of the monasteries he was given large areas of land in Sussex, including Michelham Priory. He died in 1544 and was buried at Arundel Castle.

His only son was Henry Fitzalan, 12th Earl of Arundel.

Footnotes

References

|-

1476 births
1544 deaths
15th-century English people
16th-century English nobility
08
18
Knights of the Bath
Knights of the Garter